Kita-Nijūyo-Jō Station (北24条駅) is a Sapporo Municipal Subway station in Kita-ku, Sapporo, Hokkaido, Japan. The station number is N03.

Platforms

Surrounding area
 Japan National Route 5, (to Hakodate)
 Kita-Nijūyo-Jō Bus Terminal
 Sapporo Kita Health Center, Sapporo Kita Kumin Center
 Sapporo Kita Ward Office
 Mikaho Gymnasium, (ice rink)
 Sapporo Kita-Nijūyo-Jō Post Office
 Police Station, Kita-Nijūyo-Jō Post
 Sapporo City Kita Fire Department
 Round One, Amusement Center
 ARCS super store, Kita-Nijūyo-Jō branch
 Maxvalu Supermarket, Kita branch
 Sapporo Sun Plaza, Hotel
 Sorachi Shinkin Bank, Sapporo Kita branch
 Engaru Shinkin Bank, Sapporo branch
 North Pacific Bank, Kita-Nijūyo-Jō branch
 Hokkaido Bank, Kita-Nijūyo-Jō branch

External links
 Sapporo Subway Stations

 

Railway stations in Japan opened in 1971
Railway stations in Sapporo
Sapporo Municipal Subway
Kita-ku, Sapporo